Louise Eisenhardt (17 July 1891 – 22 January 1967) was one of the first neuropathologists and was considered leading world expert on tumor diagnosis. She became the first woman president of the American Association of Neurological Surgeons.

Early life
Eisenhardt's parents were Albert Emil Eisenhardt of Königsberg, Prussia (now Kaliningrad, Russia) and Ella Knoll Eisenhardt. Her family was Protestant. She was born in Ramsey, New Jersey in 1891. Before deciding to go to medical school, she was working as an editorial assistant for Dr. Harvey Cushing and continued to work for him while enrolled. Eisenhardt graduated from Tufts medical school in 1925 with the largest academic record ever attained there.

Career
She did an internship at New England Hospital for women and children. Starting 1922, she kept a log of operative tumors on various types of intracranial tumors ever treated by Cushing.

Eisenhardt rejoined Cushing as a neuropathologist after doing a residency for a year. She worked as his surgery associate from 1928 to 1934 and helped diagnose tumors and tissues that he operated on. She co-authored papers with him along with teaching psychopathology at Tufts.

In 1934, Eisenhardt moved with Cushing when he went from Harvard to Yale. Together they worked on a brain tumor registry with more than 2000 specimens. After Cushing died in 1938, Eisenhardt became the curator. She helped neurosurgeons around the world identify tumors and their treatments. The registry was also used to educate neuroscience students in the pathology of intracranial tumors.

In 1944, Eisenhardt became the managing editor of Journal of Neurosurgery and stayed one for 22 years. As of 2003, she was the only female president American Association of Neurological Surgeons.

References

Tufts University School of Medicine alumni
1891 births
1967 deaths
People from Ramsey, New Jersey
American neurosurgeons
American people of German descent
20th-century surgeons